Andreas Wiegel (born 21 July 1991) is a German professional footballer who plays as a winger for Rot-Weiss Essen.

Early life
Wiegel attended the Gesamtschule Berger Feld.

Career
Wiegel signed a two-year senior contract until 2013 with Schalke 04 on 25 June 2011. However, his first senior appearance for the club would not come until 14 December when he traveled to Israel for the clubs Europa League clash against Israeli Premier League team Maccabi Haifa in which Schalke ran out 3–1 winners, with Wiegel scoring in the 92nd minute. In 2011–12, he was a regular player of Schalke's second team in their Regionalliga West campaign with 32 appearances but he had not been called up for a Bundesliga match of the first team.

In August 2012, Wiegel joined 2. Bundesliga side Erzgebirge Aue on a two-year contract. A year later he signed for Rot-Weiß Erfurt on loan, a move that was made permanent after one season.

He signed with MSV Duisburg for the 2015–16 season. He re-signed for two more years on 30 May 2018, which his contract running till Summer 2020. He left Duisburg after the 2018–19 season.

He joined Belgian club Waasland-Beveren on 20 July 2019.

On 12 October 2021, he returned to Germany and signed with BFC Dynamo.

References

External links

1991 births
Sportspeople from Paderborn
Footballers from North Rhine-Westphalia
Living people
German footballers
Germany youth international footballers
People educated at the Gesamtschule Berger Feld
Association football forwards
Association football midfielders
2. Bundesliga players
3. Liga players
Regionalliga players
Belgian Pro League players
FC Schalke 04 players
FC Schalke 04 II players
FC Erzgebirge Aue players
FC Rot-Weiß Erfurt players
MSV Duisburg players
S.K. Beveren players
Berliner FC Dynamo players
Rot-Weiss Essen players
German expatriate footballers
German expatriate sportspeople in Belgium
Expatriate footballers in Belgium